The 2022–23 Slovenian PrvaLiga is the 32nd edition of the Slovenian PrvaLiga since its establishment in 1991. The season began on 15 July 2022 and will end on 20 May 2023. The winners of the league will qualify for the first qualifying round of the 2023–24 UEFA Champions League.

Maribor are the defending champions after winning their sixteenth title in the previous season.

Competition format
Each team will play 36 matches (18 home and 18 away). Teams will play four matches against each other (2 home and 2 away).

Teams
Aluminij were relegated after finishing last in the previous season. Gorica were promoted from the Slovenian Second League.

Stadiums and locations
Seating capacity only; some stadiums also have standing areas.

Personnel and kits

Managerial changes

League table

Results

First half of the season

Second half of the season

PrvaLiga play-off
A two-legged play-off between the ninth-placed team from the PrvaLiga and the second-placed team from the 2022–23 Slovenian Second League will be played. The winner will earn a place in the 2023–24 PrvaLiga season.

Statistics

Top scorers

See also
2022–23 Slovenian Football Cup
2022–23 Slovenian Second League

References

External links
 

Slovenian PrvaLiga seasons
Slovenia
1
Current association football seasons